Dame Frances Lannon DBE FRHistS (born 22 December 1945) is a retired British academic and educator. She was Principal of Lady Margaret Hall, Oxford.

Born in Newcastle-upon-Tyne, she was educated at Lady Margaret Hall (BA) and at St Antony's College (DPhil). After teaching at Queen Mary's College and holding a Fellowship at the Woodrow Wilson International Center for Scholars, she was in 1977 appointed Fellow and Tutor in Modern History at Lady Margaret Hall. She was Vice-Principal 1992–97 and became Principal in 2002. She retired on 30 September 2015.

Lannon is a Fellow of the Royal Historical Society. In 2006, she was a visiting scholar at the Australian National University Research School of Social Sciences and Australian Consortium for Social and Political Research Incorporated Centre for Social Research.

Lannon was appointed Dame Commander of the Order of the British Empire (DBE) in the 2016 Birthday Honours for services to higher education.

Publications
Frances Lannon, Catholic Bilbao from Restoration to Republic: a Selective Study of Educational Institutions, 1876–1931 (University of Oxford DPhil thesis 1975)
Frances Lannon, Privilege, Persecution, and Prophecy: the Catholic Church in Spain, 1875–1975 (Oxford: Clarendon Press, 1987)
Frances Lannon and Paul Preston (editors) Elites and Power in Twentieth-Century Spain: Essays in Honour of Sir Raymond Carr (Oxford: Clarendon Press, 1990)
Frances Lannon, 'Women and Images of Women in the Spanish Civil War', Transactions of the Royal Historical Society 6th series, 1 (1991), 213–228
Frances Lannon, 1898 and the Politics of Catholic Identity in Spain, in Austen Ivereigh, ed., The Politics of Religion in an Age of Revival (London: Institute of Latin American Studies, 2000)
Frances Lannon, The Spanish Civil War, 1936–1939 (Oxford: Osprey, 2002)
Frances Lannon, Lady Margaret Hall, Oxford: the First 125 Years, 1879–2004 (Oxford: Lady Margaret Hall, 2004)

References

External links
Profile at Debretts

1945 births
Living people
People from Newcastle upon Tyne
Alumni of Lady Margaret Hall, Oxford
Alumni of St Antony's College, Oxford
Academics of the University of London
British women historians
Fellows of Lady Margaret Hall, Oxford
Principals of Lady Margaret Hall, Oxford
Religion academics
British Roman Catholics
British people of Irish descent
Fellows of the Royal Historical Society
Dames Commander of the Order of the British Empire